

Final standings

ACC tournament
See 1963 ACC men's basketball tournament

NCAA tournament

Regional semi-finals
Duke        81, New York U     76

Regional finals
Duke        73, Saint Joseph's    59

National semi-finals
Loyola (IL) 94, Duke           75

National third place
Duke         85, Oregon St     63

ACC's NCAA record
3–1

NIT
League rules prevented ACC teams from playing in the NIT, 1954–1966

External links
 Info at SportsStats.com